Richard Kipkemboi Mateelong (born 14 October 1983) is a Kenyan professional long-distance runner who specializes in the 3000 metre steeplechase. He won an Olympic bronze medal at the 2008 Beijing Olympics and he has two World Championship medals in the discipline.

Career
He was born in Lenape village, near Narok town in 1983. He started running in 1998, while at high school. He graduated from Moi Amalo Secondary School in 2001 and then joined Kenya Police. In 2004 he finished fifth at the Kenyan Olympic trials, missing the Olympics but was selected for the African Championships, where he won a silver medal.

Mainly competing on the European track and field circuit, he qualified for the IAAF World Athletics Final in 2004, 2005 and 2006, eventually winning a silver medal in the latter edition. His times continued to improve and his new personal best of 8:07.50 set in Rome made him the third fastest man that year. The 2007 season marked a breakthrough for Mateelong as he reached the podium at his first World Championships by taking the bronze medal in the men's steeplechase race. He closed the year with a second consecutive silver at the World Athletics Final.

He made a strong start to the 2008 season, becoming African steeplechase champion at the 2008 African Championships in Athletics. He went on to win his first ever Olympic medal at the 2008 Beijing Olympics later that year, finishing behind compatriot Brimin Kipruto and Mahiedine Mekhissi-Benabbad in the Olympic final. He again managed to get in the medals at the 2008 IAAF World Athletics Final and won bronze on that occasion.

The 2009 World Championships in Athletics brought a new steeplechase best of 8:00.89 for Mateelong, and although he did not beat Ezekiel Kemboi it was enough to win his first silver medal at the global championship level. He competed at the 2009 IAAF World Athletics Final (the final edition of the competition) but failed to maintain his form and finished eighth.

He ran in the Giro Media Blenio 10K in 2010 and finished in third place behind Moses Mosop and Imane Merga.

At the Doha 2012 Diamond League meeting, Mateelong was second to compatriot Paul Koech in the steeplechase, in a new personal best time of 7:56.81. This makes Mateelong the eighth fastest man in history. He came fourth behind Abel Mutai at the Kenyan Olympic trials, however, meaning he did not gain selection for the Kenyan team.

, he lives in Nyeri and is married with one child. He is  managed by Gianni Demadonna. He is technically advised by Renato Canova.

Achievements

Personal bests
1500 metres - 3:41.79 min (2005)
3000 metres - 7:48.71 min (2005)
5000 metres - 13:30.4 min (2006)
3000 metre steeplechase - 7:56.81 min (2012)

References

IAAF, 27 August 2007: Focus on Africa - Richard Kipkemboi MATELONG

1983 births
Living people
Kenyan male steeplechase runners
Kenyan male long-distance runners
People from Narok County
Athletes (track and field) at the 2008 Summer Olympics
Olympic athletes of Kenya
Olympic bronze medalists for Kenya
Commonwealth Games gold medallists for Kenya
Commonwealth Games medallists in athletics
World Athletics Championships medalists
Medalists at the 2008 Summer Olympics
Athletes (track and field) at the 2010 Commonwealth Games
Olympic bronze medalists in athletics (track and field)
Kenyan male cross country runners
IAAF Continental Cup winners
Medallists at the 2010 Commonwealth Games